The 1978 John Player League was the tenth competing of what was generally known as the Sunday League.  The competition was won for the second time by Hampshire County Cricket Club.

Standings

Batting averages

Bowling averages

See also
Sunday League

References

John Player
Pro40